Cachela Boane (born 28 December 1972) is a Mozambican footballer. He played in 13 matches for the Mozambique national football team from 1993 to 1997. He was also named in Mozambique's squad for the 1996 African Cup of Nations tournament.

References

1972 births
Living people
Mozambican footballers
Mozambique international footballers
1996 African Cup of Nations players
Place of birth missing (living people)
Association football forwards
C.D. Maxaquene players